The Network was an American six-piece new wave band. A secret side project of rock band Green Day, they released their debut album Money Money 2020 on Adeline Records on September 30, 2003. After a 15-year hiatus, the band became active again in 2020, releasing a follow-up album titled Money Money 2020 Part II: We Told Ya So! in December 2020.

History

Formed in the Summer of 2003, the band consisted of lead vocalist Fink, bassist Van Gough, and drummer Snoo, as well as additional members Captain Underpants and Z on keyboards and rhythm guitarist Balducci. They claimed they were "brought together by an ancient prophecy".

The band's debut album Money Money 2020 was released in September 2003 on Green Day singer Billie Joe Armstrong's record label Adeline Records. The Network concealed their identities by using accents and wearing masks.  They frequently released press statements denouncing Green Day.

There is also an unsubstantiated rumor that members of the band Devo were involved, but their alleged participation has not been acknowledged by anyone in either band.

Shortly before the release of the debut album, Green Day's then in the works album Cigarettes and Valentines was reportedly stolen. Due to the timeframe of the theft and the release of this album, many people speculated that they were related, however, Billie Joe Armstrong has denied connections between the two projects in various interviews, and in fact, that album was recovered and Armstrong and Mike Dirnt stated they had plans for it.

Money Money 2020 was re-mastered and re-released by Reprise Records on November 9, 2004, with two additional tracks, "Hammer of the Gods" and a cover of The Misfits "Teenagers from Mars", which can also be heard on Tony Hawk's American Wasteland while "Roshambo" is on the NHL 2005 soundtrack. The original Money Money 2020 release came with a companion DVD with music videos directed and produced by Roy Miles of AntiDivision.

In October 2005, the group opened for Green Day for several shows. After this, they became inactive.

In October 2020, after 15 years of inactivity, the band released a teaser trailer entitled "The Prophecy". In the video's description, the band announced the release of their forthcoming album Money Money 2020 Part II: We Told Ya So!. On November 2, 2020, the band released a song entitled "Ivankkka Is a Nazi" to their YouTube page with an accompanying music video.  On November 20, 2020, the band released an EP entitled Trans Am to promote their upcoming album, which is when they revealed the full title of their new album.  Following music videos for the songs "Flat Earth" and "Fentanyl," the band released one-minute teaser videos for each group of songs (based upon the vinyl tracklisting) every day of the week of the album's release.  On December 4, 2020, Money Money 2020 Part II: We Told Ya So! was released on streaming worldwide.

Identities

At the time, Armstrong denied the involvement of any Green Day members in The Network, saying "All I gotta say is fuck The Network. These guys are totally spreading rumors." 

However, the three members of Green Day are cited as songwriters for Money Money 2020 by the group's publisher. Additionally, several journalists noted the band's vocals were unmistakably that of Armstrong, and the fact Armstrong have The Network sticker on his guitar amplifier.

In a 2013 interview, bassist Mike Dirnt finally revealed that the group was in fact Green Day, mentioning that Money Money 2020 was worked upon alongside other Green Day projects in the mid-00's.

Members
 Fink (Billie Joe Armstrong) – vocals, lead guitar 
 Van Gough (Mike Dirnt) – vocals, bass guitar 
 The Snoo (Tré Cool) – vocals, drums 
 Z (unknown) – keyboards, backing vocals 
 Captain Underpants (unknown) – keytar, backing vocals 
 Balducci (Jason White) – rhythm guitar, backing vocals

Discography

Studio albums

Extended plays

DVDs

Singles

Music videos

References

American new wave musical groups
Bands with fictional stage personas
Green Day
Musical groups established in 2003
Musical groups disestablished in 2005
Musical groups reestablished in 2020
Adeline Records artists
Masked musicians

it:Green Day#Side project